Duane Leighton Christopherson (November 21, 1930 – October 16, 2003) was an American football coach.  He was the first head football coach at Northwestern College—now known as the University of Northwestern – St. Paul—in Roseville, Minnesota, serving for one season, in 1973, and compiling a record of 1–6.

References

1930 births
2003 deaths
Northwestern Eagles football coaches
People from Otter Tail County, Minnesota